Chodes is a municipality in the province of Zaragoza, Aragon, Spain. , Chodes had a population of 152. The municipality has an area of 16 square kilometers, and is along the Jalón River and the Isuela river.

References

External links
http://www.chodes.es

Municipalities in the Province of Zaragoza